"Between the Lines" is the first single by Evermore, taken from their third studio album Truth of the World: Welcome to the Show. Evermore's Jon Hume said that "Between the Lines was the first song to come out of a search for a new musical experience as a band." It was released as a free download on Evermore's official website on 10 November 2008.

The song failed to chart in Australia and New Zealand as it was not physically released as a single by the band; it was more of a teaser of the band's new musical direction on their new album. The song, however, has become a favourite amongst fans and is now a staple song in the band's live setlist.

Music video
A music video has been made for the single. The band stated that they had grown tired of miming in their previous music videos, and therefore, they made this video such that the audio you hear was recorded whilst the video was shot.

The TV screens shown in the back of shot are being used again by the band as part of their new high-tech live setup that they are taking with them to every show on their current Australian tour.

Track listing

Release history

Personnel
Jon Hume – vocals, guitar, programming
Peter Hume – bass, keyboards, synthesizers, programming
Dann Hume – drums, piano, percussion

References

Evermore (band) songs
2008 singles
2008 songs
Warner Music Australasia singles